Deelemanella is a monotypic genus of  comb-footed spiders containing the single species, Deelemanella borneo. It was first described by H. Yoshida in 2003, and is found on Borneo. This genus was named after the Dutch arachnologist Christa L. Deeleman-Reinhold.

See also
 List of Theridiidae species

References

Monotypic Araneomorphae genera
Spiders of Asia
Theridiidae